The M-26–Silver River Culvert is a highway bridge located on M-26 over the Silver River in Eagle Harbor Township, Michigan. The Keweenaw County Road Commission built the bridge in 1930; they also built the US 41–Fanny Hooe Creek Bridge and the M-26–Cedar Creek Culvert around the same time.  The M-26–Silver River Culvert was listed on the National Register of Historic Places in 1999.

See also

References

External links

Buildings and structures in Keweenaw County, Michigan
Road bridges on the National Register of Historic Places in Michigan
Bridges completed in 1930
Transportation in Keweenaw County, Michigan
National Register of Historic Places in Keweenaw County, Michigan
Steel bridges in the United States
M-26 (Michigan highway)